The Gerry Connolly Cross County Trail is a 40.5-mile hiking trail in Fairfax County, Virginia that traverses the entire length of the county in an arc that begins and ends at different points near the Potomac River.  The northern portion of the trail follows Difficult Run, while the southern half largely follows Accotink Creek and Pohick Creek.

The concept for the trail was spearheaded in the late 1990s by hiking enthusiast Bill Niedringhaus, who noticed a nearly continuous stretch of publicly owned land across the county.  Gerry Connolly, then Chairman of the Fairfax County Board of Supervisors, supported the effort and introduced a resolution to create the trail in 1998.  The construction of the trail in the early 2000s was the largest construction project in the Fairfax County Park Authority's history.  In 2014, it was named after Connolly.

References 

Hiking trails in Virginia
Fairfax County, Virginia